Bronson Chama (born 4 March 1986) is a Zambian professional footballer who plays as a defender.

External links 
 
 
 Interview with zambianfootball.co.zm

1986 births
Living people
Zambian footballers
Association football defenders
Mufulira Wanderers F.C. players
Nkana F.C. players
Kabwe Warriors F.C. players
Red Arrows F.C. players
Zambia international footballers